Trusona is an American company based in Scottsdale, Arizona, that specializes in identity theft protection and created a personal authentication technology for the FBI.

Trusona's founder and CEO is Ori Eisen. According to Eisen, “All of the companies we work with are Fortune 500 companies or government agencies”.

Microsoft Ventures and the existing investor, Kleiner Perkins Caufield & Byers, joined in a $10 million round of financing for Trusona to rethink the traditional password. On May 11, 2017, Trusona announced support for passwordless entry on Salesforce.com.

References

External links
 

Identity theft
Fraud
Companies based in Arizona
Password authentication
Identity documents of the United States
Security